Global Securities Lending was a quarterly trade magazine focusing on the worldwide securities lending industry, with in-depth features and news analysis on the industry.

The magazine also featured a website with daily news, as well as video reports and interviews. GSL also organised worldwide summits for individuals involved in the securities lending industry.

Global Securities Lending magazine was aimed at borrowers, lenders and other individuals in the worldwide securities lending market.

Background
Securities lending refers to a practice in the financial markets where one party lends its shares to another temporarily, in exchange for collateral, which may be in the form of cash or other shares. The borrower uses the lent shares for a variety of reasons, including short selling.

Global Securities Lending  was founded in 2008 by Mark Latham, a publishing and television entrepreneur, and the magazine is owned by 2i Media. In 2008 Jon Hewson, a broadcasting senior executive, joined the board of 2i Media. In 2009 Roy Zimmerhansl became the editor-in-chief of 2i Media's financial products, including sister publication Investor Services Journal.

In 2010, GSL was incorporated with Investor Services Journal to form Fundamentals magazine.

Summits
Global Securities Lending organised summits for members of the securities lending industry on issues impacting the sector.

From 2009 summits were held in across the world including London, Tokyo, Toronto, Dubai and Amsterdam.

References

External links
 GSL.tv
 ISJ.tv - GSL's sister publication, which focuses on investor services

Business magazines published in the United Kingdom
Magazines established in 2008
Magazines disestablished in 2010
Quarterly magazines published in the United Kingdom
Defunct magazines published in the United Kingdom